Eagleson is a station on Ottawa, Ontario's transitway served by OC Transpo buses. It is located in the western transitway section at Eagleson Road and Highway 417. Eastbound buses enter the station; westbound buses remain on Eagleson and service is from an adjacent bus stop.

The station also has a large park and ride facility, which was named after a former City of Kanata councillor, Eva James, who died in December, 1995, shortly after its official opening.

A second parking section was later added west of Eagleson Road.

Service

The following routes serve Eagleson station as of October 6 2019:

Notes
1. Rapid route 63 from stop 4A (local north) only operates during morning rush hours on weekdays.

References

External links
Eagleson East station page
Eagleson West Page
OC Transpo Area Map
 Eva James Park & Ride (See "Photo PARK1")

Transitway (Ottawa) stations